Elena Dementieva was the defending champion, but lost in the quarterfinals to Venus Williams.

Venus Williams won in the final, 6–4, 6–2, over Virginie Razzano.

Seeds
The top eight seeds receive a bye into the second round.

Draw

Finals

Top half

Section 1

Section 2

Bottom half

Section 3

Section 4

Notes

External links
Draw

Dubai Tennis Championships - Women's Singles
2009 Dubai Tennis Championships